Tregaskis is a surname. Notable people with the surname include:

Chris Tregaskis (born 1965), New Zealand rugby union player
Richard Tregaskis (1916–1973), American journalist and author

See also
Trevaskis